José Abad Santos y Basco (February 19, 1886 – May 1, 1942) was the fifth chief justice of the Supreme Court of the Philippines. He briefly served as the acting president of the Commonwealth of the Philippines and acting commander-in-chief of the Armed Forces of the Philippines during World War II, on behalf of President Quezon after the government went in exile to the United States. After about two months, he was executed by the Japanese forces for refusing to cooperate during their occupation of the country.

Together with Josefa Llanes Escoda and Vicente Lim, he is memorialized on the Philippines' 1,000-Peso banknote depicting Filipinos who fought and died resisting the Japanese occupation of the Philippines during World War II.

Early life and legal career
José Abad Santos was born on February 19, 1886, in San Fernando, Pampanga. He was the seventh of the ten children of Vicente Abad Santos and Toribia Basco (from Guagua, Pampanga). His brother Pedro eventually emerged as a leading socialist leader during the Commonwealth era. He finished his early education in his hometown. In 1904, he was sent to the United States as a government pensioner. He finished a pre-law course at the Santa Clara College in Santa Clara, California; his Bachelor of Laws at Northwestern University in Evanston, Illinois; and his Masters of Laws at George Washington University in 1909. He was admitted to the Philippine Bar in 1911 and later served as assistant attorney at the Bureau of Justice from 1913 to 1917.

In 1919, Abad Santos was instrumental in laying the legal groundwork, as well as drafting the by-laws and constitution of the Philippine Women's University, the country and Asia's first private non-sectarian women's institute of higher learning.

Role in the Philippine government

Department of Justice
Abad Santos was later appointed as the first Filipino corporate lawyer of the Philippine National Bank, Manila Railroad Company and other government corporations. He went to the Department of Justice, where he became attorney-general, undersecretary of justice, then secretary of justice from 1921 to 1923. In July 1923, he resigned as secretary of justice together with other department secretaries as a result of the controversy between Governor-General Leonard Wood and Filipino leaders.

Chief Justice

Abad Santos then served as chief counsel of the president of the Senate and the speaker of the House of Representatives of the Philippines. In 1926, he went to the United States as head of the Philippine educational mission. He was again appointed secretary of justice in 1928 and re-appointed on July 1, 1931. In 1932, he became an associate justice of the Supreme Court. He became its chief justice on December 24, 1941. As part of the emergency reorganization of the Commonwealth government, Abad Santos, in his capacity as chief justice, was given the responsibilities previously handled by the secretary of justice (the position of secretary of justice was abolished for the duration of the war). Abad Santos accompanied the Commonwealth government to Corregidor, where on December 30, 1941, he administered the oath of office to President Quezon and Vice-President Osmeña for the second term to which they had been elected in November of that year. He also undertook, with Manuel Roxas, the supervision of the destruction of Commonwealth government currency to prevent its falling into enemy hands.

World War II
With the Japanese invasion rapidly advancing to the southern part of the Philippines, President Manuel L. Quezon was advised by General Douglas MacArthur to establish a government in exile to the United States; Quezon invited Chief Justice Abad Santos to leave with him. The latter declined preferring to remain in the Philippines and carry on his work and stay with his family. On March 17, 1942, the day of Quezon's departure at Zamboanguita, Negros Oriental for the United States by way of Australia, he appointed Abad Santos as the acting president with full authority to act in the name of, and on behalf of the president of the Commonwealth of the Philippines and become the acting commander-in-chief of the Armed Forces of the Philippines in some areas unoccupied by the Japanese.

Death
On April 11, 1942, Abad Santos, his son José Jr. (nicknamed Pepito), Col. Benito Valeriano and two enlisted men were captured by the Japanese in Barangay Tubod in Barili, Cebu while traveling by automobile to Toledo, Cebu. He identified himself as the chief justice of the Supreme Court of the Philippines. He and his son were then taken to a concentration camp in Basak San Nicolas, Cebu City. When asked to cooperate with the Japanese, he refused. Although he had nothing to do with military operations, they imputed to him, as acting president, the destruction of the bridges and other public works in Cebu that had been undertaken by the USAFFE forces to delay the invasion of the island.

The Japanese high commander, Kiyotake Kawaguchi, took him and his son aboard a ship on April 26, 1942, thinking they were heading to Manila. Instead, they arrived on April 28 at Parang, Cotabato (now in Maguindanao). The next day they were brought to Malabang, Lanao, arriving on April 30. After two days' confinement at Japanese camps, Abad Santos was called in front of Kawaguchi and was informed about the order of his execution. Before he was shot to death, he was able to talk to his son Pepito. Among his last parting words to his son were, "Do not cry, Pepito, show to these people that you are brave. It is an honor to die for one's country. Not everybody has that chance." Abad Santos was executed at 2:00 pm, on May 1, 1942, under a tall coconut tree near a river bank. He refused to be blindfolded and refused the last cigarette offered to him.

Death and burial site
On May 1, 1942, Chief Justice Jose Abad Santos was executed by Japanese troops in Malabang, Lanao del Sur.  

Prior to 2014, the public knew Abad Santos was executed either on the dates May 2 or May 7, 1942.  But the National Historical Commission of the Philippines (NHCP) ascertained May 1, 1942 using the Japanese war crime records found in the National Archives of the Philippines.

Later that afternoon of May 1, 1942, two Japanese interpreters took José's son, Pepito, to his father's grave. It was a small mound—too small, Pepito thought, to hold his father's remains if properly buried. On top of the grave lay a rock as large as a coconut. Pepito begged that he be allowed to mark the grave with a cross, but his request was denied.

After the war, an intensive search for the place where José was buried failed. Pepito did not find the hut and the trees, which would have served as points of reference for locating the grave. The area where the execution took place had been plowed and planted to root crops.

Date of execution
The date of his execution is often reported as May 7 or May 2. But the National Historical Commission of the Philippines (NHCP) ascertained May 1, 1942 using the Japanese war crime records found in the National Archives of the Philippines.

Personal life
On September 21, 1918, Abad Santos was married to Amanda Teopaco daughter of Pedro Teopaco member of the Malolos Congress and has five children José Jr. (born 1919), Luz (born 1920), Amanda (born 1921), Osmundo (born 1922) and Victoria (born 1924). A staunch Methodist, Abad Santos worshiped at Central United Methodist Church along T.M. Kalaw Street in Ermita, Manila (then known as the Central Methodist Episcopal Church). Abad Santos was a freemason and a member of the Upsilon Sigma Phi fraternity. He was a freemason and a member of the Upsilon Sigma Phi fraternity.

Commemoration
On 1945, one of the six campuses of Arellano University was built in Pasay City and its name is derived by his name.
When the Philippine Women's University established its primary and secondary education divisions in 1949, they named the school as Jose Abad Santos Memorial School in honor of Abad Santos who was a former chairman of the board of trustees of the university.
The Municipality of Trinidad in Davao del Sur province, created in 1948, was renamed as the Municipality of Jose Abad Santos in his honor in 1955. The municipality was later included in Davao Occidental in 2013.
Abad Santos Avenue, a city street in Tondo, Manila was renamed in his honor in 1955.
The Abad Santos station of LRT-1, near Abad Santos Avenue in Tondo that opened in 1985, is named after him.
Starting 1991, he is commemorated on the ₱ 1,000 banknote of the Philippines together with Brigadier General Vicente Lim and Josefa Llanes Escoda, founder of the Girl Scouts of the Philippines, who were all killed by the Imperial Japanese Army during the Second World War.
Jose Abad Santos Avenue, a major highway in Central Luzon, was renamed in his honor in 2007.
On 2018, Philippine World War II Memorial Foundation launched a book entitled Honor: The Legacy of Jose Abad Santos,

In popular culture
Portrayed by Lito Legaspi in the 1998 series Bayani in the episode Jose Abad Santos
Portrayed by Alex Medina and Ricardo Cepeda in the 2018 documentary-film, Honor: The Legacy of Jose Abad Santos

References

Further reading

 Aquino, Ramón C. (1985) "Chief Justice José Abad Santos 1886-1942: A Biography" Phoenix Publishing House, Quezon City

Kapampangan people
Executed politicians
People executed by Japanese occupation forces
1886 births
1942 deaths
Secretaries of Finance of the Philippines
Secretaries of Justice of the Philippines
Chief justices of the Supreme Court of the Philippines
Associate Justices of the Supreme Court of the Philippines
20th-century Filipino lawyers
Filipino Freemasons
Filipino people of Chinese descent
George Washington University Law School alumni
Jose
Executed Filipino people
Santa Clara University alumni
Filipino expatriates in the United States
People from San Fernando, Pampanga
Quezon administration cabinet members
Unofficial Presidents of the Philippines